Yafanovskaya is a rural locality (a village) in Verkhovskoye Rural Settlement, Tarnogsky District, Vologda Oblast, Russia. The population was 12 as of 2002.

Geography 
Yafanovskaya is located 38 km southwest of Tarnogsky Gorodok (the district's administrative centre) by road. Davydovskaya is the nearest rural locality.

References 

Rural localities in Tarnogsky District